Berkersheim is a quarter of Frankfurt am Main, Germany. It is part of the Ortsbezirk Nord-Ost.

Berkersheim had been an independent town until 1910 when it was suburbanised. It is located in the north-eastern part of Frankfurt and borders the districts of Harheim to the north, Frankfurter Berg to the west, Preungesheim and Seckbach to the south and the town of Bad Vilbel to the east.

References

Districts of Frankfurt